Hanımçiftliği (literally "lady's farm") is a town in the central district (Malatya) of Malatya Province, Turkey. At , Hanımçiftliği is situated to the north of Malatya and on the highway connecting Malatya to the Karakaya Dam reservoir and Battalgazi. It is almost merged to Malatya. The population of Hanımçiftliği is 12670 as of 2011. Hanımçiftliği was named after a land lady and according to a popular and not so plausible legend cited in the mayor's page, the former owner of the settlement sold the settlement in exchange for a kiss during the Ottoman Empire era. In 1973, the settlement was declared a seat of township. The most important economic sector is farming. Various fruits and vegetables, especially apricot, are produced. There are also some factories around. Some town residents work in the industries and services in Malatya.

References

Populated places in Malatya Province
Towns in Turkey
Malatya Central District